Shakespeare is the debut album by comedian Anthony Jeselnik released digitally on September 21, 2010 by Comedy Central Records.

Track listing

Bonus track

A bonus track released separately and used to help promote the album. It features Anthony berating an audience member who interrupted his set by shouting, "Ninja".

Reception
Shakespeare was met with extremely positive reviews. Napster claimed "[His] outstanding writing and shameless self-promotion bordering on cult of personality are a winning combination. One of the best comedy albums of the season." Punchline Magazine'''s Brendan McLaughlin praised the album stating, "Anthony Jeselnik writes great jokes—plain and simple. He’s a master of the one-two punch. Now, he’s not the only game in town when it comes to slinging one liners, but he’s one of the best, and here’s why: Jeselnik’s stand-up embodies one of the most distinct, specific, unflinching comic personas on the scene today." The same publication then even chose it as its comedy album of the year. Saying, "Despite his relatively young age (he’s 31 as of this writing), Jeselnik is one of the best joke writers in comedy. His album Shakespeare is that confirmation. From start to finish, he delivers pristine, precise and economical bits with the polish of a 20-year stand-up veteran. There was a lot of solid comedy released this year; but no other album gave us as rich an experience as Shakespeare''.

Chart positions

References

2010 live albums
Comedy Central Records live albums
Stand-up comedy albums
2010s comedy albums
2010s spoken word albums
Live comedy albums
Anthony Jeselnik albums